The Brazilian Bridge Federation is the national organization for bridge in Brazil and a member of the Confederacion Sudamericana de Bridge and the World Bridge Federation. It was founded in 1945 as the Confederação Brasileira de Bridge (Brazilian Bridge Confederation), affiliated with the World Bridge Federation in 1979, and fully recognized by it in June 1999.

The organization is based in Rio de Janeiro. Its president is Francisco de Assis Chagas de Mello e Silva and its vice president is Jeovani Salomão. Ernesto d’Orsi was president from 1983 to 2001 and is now president emeritus.  it has 1,194 members. Relatively few people play bridge in Brazil, approximately 40,000 or between 40,000 and 50,000.

See also
 World Bridge Federation
 List of bridge federations

References

External links

Bridge Brasil 

Non-profit organisations based in Brazil
Contract bridge governing bodies
Bridge
Sports organizations established in 1945